A by-election for the Victorian Legislative Assembly district of Broadmeadows was conducted on 19 February 2011, and was retained by the Labor Party.

The by-election was triggered by the resignation on 21 December 2010 of John Brumby, the former Premier of Victoria whose 11-year incumbent Labor government was defeated at the 2010 election. Writs for the by-election were issued on 20 January 2011.

Background
Primary votes in Broadmeadows at the 2010 election saw Labor win 62.3 percent and the Liberals win 25.3 percent, with a 71 percent two-party Labor vote. Being Labor's safest seat at that election, the Liberals chose not to contest the by-election. Labor chose to stand Frank McGuire, brother of Eddie McGuire as their candidate. Nine candidates stood at the by-election, with McGuire predicted to win.

Results
Labor won the seat with a majority of primary votes alone. Turkish independent Celal Sahin made a show with a fifth of the primary vote and 30 percent of the two-candidate-preferred vote.

References

External links
Broadmeadows by-election: Victorian Electoral Commission
Broadmeadows by-election: Antony Green ABC
Broadmeadows by-election: Poll Bludger

2011 elections in Australia
Victorian state by-elections
2010s in Victoria (Australia)
February 2011 events in Australia